Achieng is both a given name and a surname. Notable people with the name include:

Conjestina Achieng (born 1977), Kenyan boxer
Sarah Opendi Achieng (born 1968), Ugandan politician
Achieng Abura (died 2016), Kenyan musician
Achieng Ajulu-Bushell (born 1994), British swimmer
Achieng Oneko (1920–2007), Kenyan freedom fighter and politician